Mackenzie is a district municipality within the Fraser-Fort George Regional District in central British Columbia, Canada. The community is located at the south end of Williston Lake. The townsite, established by Alexandra Forest Industries (acquired by BC Forest Products in 1967) and Cattermole Timber (partnered with Jujo Paper in 1970 to create Finlay Forest Industries), was named for Sir Alexander MacKenzie (1764–1820).

Demographics 

Religion 
According to the 2021 census, religious groups in Mackenzie included:
Irreligion (2,095 persons or 61.5%)
Christianity (1,260 persons or 37.0%)
Hinduism (20 persons or 0.6%)
Other (25 persons or 0.7%)

Economy
Mackenzie's main industries are logging, lumber, market pulp and tourism. Duz Cho Logging, sawmills, such as the Canfor Corporation Mackenzie sawmill (successor to BCFP's lumber division) and Conifex Timber (successor to FFI), and the Paper Excellence kraft pulp mill (successor to BCFP's pulp division), are major employers in town. As of July 2019, Canfor sawmill ceased production indefinitely as part of a province-wide curtailment of operations. The nearby Centerra Gold Mount Milligan copper-gold operation provides secondary economic activity for the town.

Recreation

In the winter, Mackenzie hosts dog sled racing, cross-country skiing, and snowmobiling competitions, and maintains 32 km of groomed cross-country ski trails. Morfee Mountain overlooks Mackenzie and is suitable for hiking and off-road vehicle usage. Mackenzie has a swimming pool, indoor skating rink, a curling rink, and two beaches on Morfee Lake; First Beach is used primarily for recreational swimming, and Second Beach includes a boat launch. Mackenzie is home to Little Mac Ski Hill, a small local ski hill and mountain-bike park located east of town and a 45-minutes drive from Powder King ski resort. The nearby lakes and forests are suitable for fishing and hunting.

Mackenzie Golf and Country Club is a semi-private, nine-hole golf course with a driving range.  It is situated within walking distance of most of the town.

Community facilities

Community facilities include a recreation centre that houses the public library, gym, swimming pool, ice rink, and community hall. There is also an art centre, a museum, two shopping malls and two schools: Mackenzie Secondary School (which also serves McLeod Lake), and Morfee Elementary School. The schools are operated by the Prince George School District (No. 57).

Mackenzie also has several religious establishments, including a Sikh temple, St. Peter's Catholic, Mackenzie Baptist and Hope Trinity (converging the Anglican, Lutheran and United faiths) churches and Living Joy Christian Centre.

Mackenzie has been served by CHMM-FM, a not-for-profit radio station since 2003.

Mackenzie has its own Royal Canadian Mounted Police detachment, a provincial courtroom, a volunteer fire department, and a municipal hospital.

Transportation
Mackenzie is located on Highway 39,  from Highway 97. There is scheduled bus service to Chetwynd and Prince George. It is served by a small airport. There is no scheduled passenger service but charter services are available.

Tourist attractions

Mackenzie is also the home of the world's largest tree crusher.

Notable people 

Turner Stevenson – Former National Hockey League player
Leah Callahan – Canadian Olympic wrestler (London 2012)

Climate
Mackenzie has a subarctic climate that has influences from the Pacific Ocean resulting in less cold winters than expected for its northerly latitude compared to other Canadian locations. It has warm summer days, but the cool nights ensure that only three months go above  in mean temperatures.

Image gallery

References

External links

districtofmackenzie.ca

District municipalities in British Columbia
Populated places in the Regional District of Fraser-Fort George